Ørneberget Station is a railway station on the Bergensbanen railway line located in the Mjølfjell area in the municipality of Voss in Vestland county, Norway. The station is served by the Bergen Commuter Rail, operated by Vy Tog, with up to five daily departures in each direction. The station was opened in 1958. The surrounding area is dominantly recreational, with many cabins.

External links
 Jernbaneverket's page on Ørneberget

Railway stations in Voss
Railway stations on Bergensbanen
Railway stations opened in 1958